is a Japanese politician of the New Komeito Party, a member of the House of Representatives in the Diet (national legislature). A native of Urawa, Saitama and graduate of Waseda University, she was elected to the House of Representatives for the first time in 2003.

References

External links 
 Official website in Japanese.

Members of the House of Representatives (Japan)
Female members of the House of Representatives (Japan)
Waseda University alumni
People from Saitama (city)
1956 births
Living people
New Komeito politicians
21st-century Japanese politicians
21st-century Japanese women politicians